Dretar is a surname. Notable people with the surname include:

Davor Dretar (born 1966), Croatian singer, radio personality, and television presenter
Tomislav Dretar (born 1945), Croatian, Bosnian, French, and Belgian poet, writer, critic, and politician